Afrodromius indotatus is a species of beetle in the family Carabidae, the only species in the genus Afrodromius.

References

Lebiinae